Bishopdale is one of the suburbs of Nelson, New Zealand.

It lies to the south of Nelson city centre, inland from Wakatu, at the foot of the Grampians Reserve.

Geography

The Grampians statistical area, which corresponds with the Bishopdale suburb, covers an area of 2.95 km².

The suburb has several public reserves: Bishopdale Reserve, Bishopdale Retention Dam Bank, Cattle Market Reserve, Station Reserve and Waimea South Reserve.

History

The estimated population of the area reached 1,910 in 1996.

It reached 2,000 in 2001, 2,010 in 2006, 2,120 in 2013, and 2,210 in 2018.

Demography

It has a population density of 850.08 people per km² as of 2019.

As of the 2018 census, the median age was 43.6, the median income was $26,300, 3.4% of people earned over $100,00, 20.6% had a Bachelor's Degree or higher, and 4.8% of the workforce was unemployed.

Ethnically, the population was 78.2% New Zealand European, 15.8% Māori, 3.7% Pacific peoples, 11.8% Asian, 1.0% Middle Eastern, Latin American, or African, and 1.1% identified with other ethnicities; 24.1% were born overseas.

Religiously, the population is 56.5% non-religious, 30.8% Christian, and 1.6% Buddhist.

Economy

In 2018, 9.8% worked in manufacturing, 8.3% worked in construction, 6.8% worked in hospitality, 6.1% worked in transport, 6.8% worked in education, and 14.4% worked in healthcare.

Transport

As of 2018, among those who commuted to work, 32.6% drove a car, 2.2% rode in a car, 3.6% use a bike, and 3.6% walk or run.

No one used public transport.

References

Suburbs of Nelson, New Zealand
Populated places in the Nelson Region